George Woodward may refer to:
 George Woodward (diplomat) (died 1735), 18th century British diplomat in Poland
 George Washington Woodward (1809–1875), American politician
 George Ratcliffe Woodward (1848–1934), British composer
 George Moutard Woodward (1765–1809), English amateur caricaturist
 George A. Woodward (1835–1916), U.S. Army general
 George Woodward (American football) (1894–1968), American football coach